Li Hongjun is a former Chinese footballer who played as a defender for the Chinese national football team.

Career statistics

Club

Notes

International

References

1970 births
Living people
Chinese footballers
China international footballers
Association football defenders
Yanbian Funde F.C. players
Beijing Guoan F.C. players
Chengdu Tiancheng F.C. players